Two general elections were held in Ireland in 1927:

 June 1927 Irish general election
 September 1927 Irish general election